Allahverdi Dehghani (born 1968) is an Iranian politician.

Dehghani was born in Varzaqan, East Azerbaijan. He is a member of the 9th Islamic Consultative Assembly from the electorate of Varzaqan. and member of Iran-Turkey Friendship society. Dehghani won with 17,575 (55.21%) votes.

References

People from East Azerbaijan Province
Deputies of Varzaqan
Living people
1968 births
Members of the 9th Islamic Consultative Assembly